Okey Leonidas Patteson (September 14, 1898July 3, 1989) was the 23rd Governor of West Virginia from 1949 to 1953. He was a member of the United States Democratic Party and of the "machine" that totally controlled politics in that era in the state.

Biography
Okey Patteson was son of L.C. and Lola (Groves) Patteson. He was born at Dingess, West Virginia and raised at Mount Hope, Fayette County. He married Lee Hawse in 1923 and they had two daughters, Fanny Lee and Anna Hughes. His religious affiliation was Methodist. In 1932, a hunting accident left him disabled, as both of his legs had to be amputated below the knees.

Patteson graduated with a bachelor's degree from West Virginia Wesleyan College and did post-graduate work at Carnegie Institute of Technology. He was awarded honorary degrees of L.L.D. from West Virginia University in 1949 and from West Virginia Wesleyan College.

Patteson worked as an automobile dealer and with real estate in Mount Hope. He served as President of Fayette County Court 1935–41 and as sheriff of Fayette County 1941–44. In the 1944 elections, he was Campaign manager for the Democratic Party and became a Presidential elector. The new governor, Clarence W. Meadows, appointed him his personal assistant, a position he held for three years, until he resigned to run for Governor, January 1, 1948. He won the nomination with a margin of 62 000 over the nearest opponent and was elected by majority of 110 000 in the general election. He served as governor for one term.

Patteson was a member of the Board of Trustees of West Virginia Wesleyan, and of a number of societies: Free masons, Knights Templar, Moose International, Lions, Chamber of Commerce, American Legion, Sons of the American Revolution and Elks. He was a member of the National Guard for three years.

After his term he served as general manager of the Turnpike, returned to real estate business, and became president of the Raleigh County Bank. In 1969, Governor Arch A. Moore, Jr. named Patteson to the newly created Board of Regents.

Governorship
He is best known for his decision to place the state's first medical school at West Virginia University in Morgantown, in the northern part of the state, rather than in the more centrally located Charleston.  A section of West Virginia Route 705 leading to West Virginia University Hospitals is named Patteson Drive in his honor.

He also is known for the initial construction of the West Virginia Turnpike, which was to be a 4-lane road system throughout the state, although, after his term, it was superseded by the interstate highway system, with only a 2-lane section between Charleston and Princeton ever completed.

During his term, the legislature created the position of state Tax Commissioner and authorized cities to levy sales taxes.

He was praised by crime writer Erle Stanley Gardner for his careful re-investigation of the case of convicted murderer Robert Ballard Bailey when doubts were raised about the validity of the conviction. Gardner dedicated his detective novel Top of the Heap to Patteson.

References

External links
patteson.html Biography of Okey L. Patteson
Inaugural Address of Okey L. Patteson

1898 births
1989 deaths
American amputees
American bank presidents
Methodists from West Virginia
American politicians with disabilities
Democratic Party governors of West Virginia
People from Mount Hope, West Virginia
People from Mingo County, West Virginia
West Virginia sheriffs
West Virginia Wesleyan College alumni
20th-century American politicians
West Virginia Wesleyan College trustees
20th-century American academics